Vulcan is a Romanian language surname. Notable people with the surname include:

Iosif Vulcan (1841–1907), magazine editor and cultural figure
Samuil Vulcan (1758–1839), Greek-Catholic bishop, great-uncle of Iosif Vulcan

Romanian-language surnames